Binche–Chimay–Binche (also known as Memorial Frank Vandenbroucke) is a single-day road bicycle race held annually between Binche and Chimay, in Wallonia, Belgium. The race is rated as a 1.1 event on the UCI Europe Tour.

The race was originally held between Binche and Tournai as it was first organized in 1911 as Binche-Tournai-Binche; it was suspended between 1931 and 1983, then again between 1997 and 2009. In 2010 it was organized again as "Binche Tournai Binche/Memorial Frank Vandenbroucke", to commemorate cyclist Frank Vandenbroucke who had died in October 2009 at 34 years of age and was at that time the last winner of the race.  In 2013 the routing changed from Tournai to Chimay, hence the name changed to Binche–Chimay–Binche.

Winners

External links

UCI Europe Tour races
Cycle races in Belgium
Recurring sporting events established in 1911
1911 establishments in Belgium
Sport in Hainaut (province)
Sport in Chimay
Sport in Tournai
Binche